The Women's Guild of Arts was founded in 1907 by Arts and Crafts artists May Morris and Mary Elizabeth Turner. The organisation offered female artists an alternative to the Art Workers Guild, the artists' association established in 1884 and based on the ideas of William Morris and the Arts and Crafts Movement, as this was not open to women. The Women's Guild was established with May Morris as its First President and watercolourist and engraver Mary Annie Sloane as its Honorary Secretary. Other members included Agnes Garrett, Mary Lowndes, Marianne Stokes, Evelyn De Morgan, Georgie Gaskin and Mary J. Newill.

Notes

References
 Elletson, Helen, May Morris, Hammersmith and the Women's Guild of Arts (pp. 141–154) in Hulse, Lynn, editor May Morris: Art & Life. New Perspectives, Friends of the William Morris Gallery, 2017 .
 Thomas, Zoe, Women Art Workers and the Arts and Crafts Movement, Manchester University Press, 2020
 Thomas, Zoe and Garrett, Miranda, Suffrage and the Arts: Visual Culture, Politics and Enterprise, Bloomsbury, 2017

External links
 Women's Guild of Arts Invitation Card at William Morris Gallery

1907 establishments in the United Kingdom
Arts organisations based in the United Kingdom
Arts organizations established in 1907
Women's organisations based in the United Kingdom